Liamorpha decorata is a species of sea snail, a marine gastropod mollusk in the family Pyramidellidae, the pyrams and their allies.

Description
The shell has an oval conic shape. The whorls of the teleoconch are decussated. The lip is undulated by the
spiral sculpture which appears on the columella, simulating two plications.

Distribution
This marine species occurs in the following locations:
 Gulf of Mexico : Texas, Mexico, Guadeloupe.

References

External links
 To Encyclopedia of Life
 To ITIS
 To World Register of Marine Species
 

Pyramidellidae
Gastropods described in 1873